SOMO Village is a $1 billion,  mixed-use redevelopment of a former Agilent campus in Rohnert Park, California ( north of San Francisco) proposed by Codding Enterprises.

Sonoma Mountain Village aims to be an environmentally friendly development.

Facilities and timeline

Plans call for Sonoma Mountain Village to be built in three to six phases over 12 years, on a site located walking distance from a proposed Sonoma–Marin Area Rail Transit station.

The proposal includes:
 1,892 units for 5,000 residents,
 a town center,
  of commercial, office and retail space,
 a charter school (Credo High School), and
 an International all-weather soccer field.
SOMO Village home construction is planned to start in 2021, and  the project is expected to create 4,400 jobs.

See also
Zero waste
Credo High School

References

Planned communities in California
Buildings and structures in Sonoma County, California
Rohnert Park, California